House Rabbit Society (HRS) is a non-profit organization based in Richmond, California, United States (US), that rescues and adopts rabbits and educates the community with its curriculum on rabbit care.  HRS promotes responsible rabbit guardianship, including spaying and neutering, regular veterinary care, diet, and exercise. HRS takes the stand that domestic rabbits should not live outdoors.
HRS was granted nonprofit status in 1993.

Organization philosophy
House Rabbit Society believes that all rabbits are valuable animals, regardless of breed purity, temperament, state of health, or whether a relationship exists with humans—the welfare of domesticated rabbits is the organization's primary consideration. HRS believes that all domestic rabbits should be spayed or neutered and should live in a human adult's home.

Adoption and education center
In the San Francisco Bay Area of the US, HRS runs an adoption and education center, the HRS Rabbit Center—also the location of the HRS home office. Prior to the existence of the HRS Rabbit Center, the daily work of the national organization was undertaken in various private homes throughout the country.

References

External links

Animal charities based in the United States
Non-profit organizations based in the San Francisco Bay Area
Charities based in California